Orchard was an artist-run exhibition and event space located at 47 Orchard Street in New York's Lower East Side from 2005-2008. The gallery was run as a for-profit limited liability corporation founded for the project. The partners included artists, filmmakers, critics, art historians, and curators. Orchard was among early contemporary art projects and galleries that moved onto Orchard and generally the Lower East Side below Delancey Street along with Miguel Abreu Gallery, Reena Spaulings, and Scorched Earth. Brandon Joseph noted, "the Orchard 'project' treaded a fine—and perhaps ultimately impossible—line between self-reflexivity and (to use a barbaric neologism) self-complicity, which could veer at times into self-promotion."

Orchard's program focused on, "thematically, conceptually and politically driven group exhibitions and projects," according to the space's website.

Orchard restaged or produced unrealized projects by Michael Asher, Andrea Fraser with Allan McCollum, Dan Graham, and Lawrence Weiner. Orchard has also presented historical works by Daniel Buren, Luis Camnitzer, Juan Downey, Hans Haacke, Roberto Jacoby, Adrian Piper, Anthony McCall and Martha Rosler, as well as new works by Martin Beck, Merlin Carpenter, Nicolás Guagnini, Jutta Koether, Josiah McElheny, Lucy McKenzie, Blake Rayne, Stephan Pascher, Jeff Preiss, R. H. Quaytman, Karin Schneider, and Jason Simon, among others.

Partners
 Rhea Anastas
 Moyra Davey
 Andrea Fraser
 Nicolás Guagnini
 Gareth James
 Christian Philipp Müller
 Jeff Preiss
 R. H. Quaytman
 Karin Schneider
 Jason Simon
 John Yancy, Jr. 
 Anonymous

References

External links
 Orchard
 Orchard Dossier
 R. H. Quaytman and art historian Rhea Anastas recount the three-year run of Orchard

Art in New York City
Art museums and galleries in New York (state)
Lower East Side
Artist-run centres